Lycomorphodes is a genus of moths in the family Erebidae.

Species
Lycomorphodes angustata Gibeaux, 1983
Lycomorphodes aracia E. D. Jones, 1914
Lycomorphodes aurobrunnea Gibeaux, 1983
Lycomorphodes bicolor Rothschild, 1913
Lycomorphodes bipartita (Walker, 1866)
Lycomorphodes calopteridion de Joannis, 1904
Lycomorphodes circinata Dognin, 1911
Lycomorphodes coccipyga Dognin, 1909
Lycomorphodes correbioides Schaus, 1911
Lycomorphodes dichroa Dognin, 1912
Lycomorphodes epatra Schaus, 1905
Lycomorphodes flavipars Hampson, 1909
Lycomorphodes genificans Dyar, 1914
Lycomorphodes granvillei Gibeaux, 1983
Lycomorphodes griseovariegata Gibeaux, 1983
Lycomorphodes hemicrocea Dognin, 1909
Lycomorphodes heringi Reich, 1933
Lycomorphodes sordida (Butler, 1877)
Lycomorphodes splendida Draudt, 1918
Lycomorphodes strigosa (Butler, 1877)
Lycomorphodes suspecta (Felder, 1875)
Lycomorphodes tortricina Rothschild, 1913

References

External links

Cisthenina
Moth genera